3rd Maldives Film Awards ceremony, presented by the Maldives Film Association, honored the best Maldivian films released in 2012 and 2013. Nominations for the major categories were announced on 28 April 2014. The ceremony was held on the same day of nomination announcement.

Feature film

Short film

Special awards

Most wins
Ingili - 11
Dhilakani - 5
Fathis Handhuvaruge Feshun 3D - 5

See also
 Maldives Film Awards

References

Maldives Film Awards
2014 film awards
2014 in the Maldives
November 2014 events in Asia